The men's heavyweight event was part of the boxing programme at the 1972 Summer Olympics. The weight class allowed boxers of more than 81 kilograms to compete. The competition was held from 3 to 10 September 1972. 14 boxers from 14 nations competed.

Medalists

Results
The following boxers took part in the event:

First round
 Teófilo Stevenson (CUB) def. Ludwik Denderys (POL), TKO-1
 Duane Bobick (USA) def. Yuri Nesterov (URS), 5:0
 Ion Alexe (ROU) def. Jozsef Reder (HUN), 5:0
 Jürgen Fanghänel (GDR) def. Atanas Suvandzhiev (BUL), KO-1
 Carroll Morgan (CAN) def. Fatai Ayinla (NGR), 3:2
 Hasse Thomsén (SWE) def. Jean Bassomben (CMR), 4:1

Quarterfinals
 Peter Hussing (FRG) def. Oscar Ludeña (PER), KO-1
 Teófilo Stevenson (CUB) def. Duane Bobick (USA), TKO-3
 Ion Alexe (ROU) def. Jürgen Fanghänel (GDR), 5:0
 Hasse Thomsén (SWE) def. Carroll Morgan (CAN), KO-3

Semifinals
 Teófilo Stevenson (CUB) def. Peter Hussing (FRG), TKO-2
 Ion Alexe (ROU) def. Hasse Thomsén (SWE), 5:0

Final
 Teófilo Stevenson (CUB) def. Ion Alexe (ROU), walk-over

References

Heavyweight